Willie Don Wright (born March 9, 1968) is a former American professional football player who was a linebacker and tight end in the National Football League (NFL) and the World League of American Football (WLAF). He played for the Phoenix Cardinals of the NFL, and the Frankfurt Galaxy of the WLAF. Wright played collegiately at the University of Wyoming.

References

1968 births
Living people
American football linebackers
American football tight ends
Frankfurt Galaxy players
Phoenix Cardinals players
Players of American football from Wyoming
People from Riverton, Wyoming
Wyoming Cowboys football players